Daemonia Nymphe (Δαιμόνια Νύμφη) is a Greek music band established in 1994 by Spyros Giasafakis and Evi Stergiou. The band's music is modeled after Ancient Greek music and is often categorized as neoclassical or neofolk.

Daemonia Nymphe uses authentic instruments, including lyre, varvitos, krotala, pandoura and double flute, which are made by the Greek master Nicholas Brass. Their shows are very theatrical, with members wearing masks and ancient dresses. Their lyrics are drawn from Orphic and Homeric hymns and Sappho's poems for Zeus and Hekate.

Members 
Spyros Giasafakis
Evi Stergiou
Maria Stergiou
Victoria Couper
Vangelis Paschalidis
Stephen Street
Christopher Brice

Discography 

The Bacchic Dance of the Nymphs, 1998
Tyrvasia, 1999
Daemonia Nymphe, 2002
The Bacchic Dance of the Nymphs – Tyrvasia, 2004Krataia Asterope, 2007Psychostasia, 2013Macbeth'', 2016

References

External links 

Official website

Greek musical groups
Prikosnovénie artists
Musical groups from Athens
Modern pagan musical groups